Simi may refer to:

Places

Greece
 Symi, also transliterated as Simi, a Greek island
 Kato Simi, an ancient place of worship on Crete
 Ano Simi, a village on Crete

California, United States
 Rancho Simi, a 1795 Spanish land grant
 Simi Valley
 Simi Hills, a mountain range
 Simi Peak
 Arroyo Simi, sometimes called Simi Creek

People

Given name 
Simi Bedford ( 1991–2007), Nigerian novelist based in Britain
Simi Fehoko (born 1997), American football player
Simi Garewal (born 1947), Indian actress
Simi Hamilton (born 1987), American cross-country skier
Simi Linton (born 1947), American author, consultant, and public speaker 
Seemi Raheel (born 1957), Pakistani senior actress working in Urdu television
Simi Sara (active 2010), Canadian radio and television broadcaster
Simi Sernaker (born 1979), American frontwoman of the rock band Suffrajett

Surname 
 Carlo Simi (1924–2000), Italian architect, production designer and costume designer
 Filadelfo Simi (1849–1923), Italian painter and sculptor
 Leandro Simi (born 1977), Brazilian futsal player
 Nerina Simi (1890-1987), Italian artist and a teacher of painting and drawing

Nicknames
 Dr. Simi, nickname of Mexican politician Víctor González Torres (born 1947)
 Simi (singer), (born 1988), Nigerian singer and songwriter

Fictional characters
 Simi, protagonist of the young adult fantasy novel Skin of the Sea by Natasha Bowen

Languages 
 Runa Simi, a Quechuan language family
 Simi or Sema language, spoken in Nagaland, India

Other uses
 Simi Winery, in Ventura County, California, U.S.
 Actenodes simi, a species of metallic wood-boring beetle in the family Buprestidae
 Pleocoma simi, a species of rain beetle in the family Pleocomidae
 Simi (mixtape), 2018, by U.S. rapper BlocBoy JB
 Simi (weapon), an African short sword
 Students Islamic Movement of India, a banned Islamist student organisation formed in 1977

See also
 Arroyo Simi Overhead, a bridge for State Route 118 in California, U.S.
Seemi, a given name or surname
Simmie (disambiguation)